CIRL-FM is a First Nations community radio station that operates at 97.9 FM in Southend, Saskatchewan, Canada.

The station is owned by Reindeer Lake Communications.

External links

Irl